Sacred Heart station is an under-construction Manila Metro Rail Transit (MRT) station situated on Line 7. The planned station will be located in Amparo Subdivision, Caloocan.

Closest landmarks include Sacred Heart Parish, a Latin Rite church belonging to the Roman Catholic Diocese of Novaliches.

External links
Proposed Sacred Heart MRT Station

Manila Metro Rail Transit System stations
Proposed railway stations in the Philippines